Corythoxestis aletreuta is a moth of the family Gracillariidae. It is known from Ethiopia, Nigeria, Rwanda, Tanzania and Uganda.

The larvae feed on Canthium, Coffea arabica, Coffea liberica and Coffea robusta. They probably mine the leaves of their host plant.

References

Phyllocnistinae
Moths of Africa
Moths described in 1936